Tangja Leela Pakhangba (1445 BC-1405 BC) is the first king of Ancient Manipur (Antique Kangleipak) civilization. He is the father of King Ningthou Kangba (1405 BC-1359 BC) and the grandfather of King Maliyapham Palcha (Koi Koi) (1359 BC-1329 BC). He is the consort of Queen Sinbee Leima, the daughter of the chief of the Leihou tribe.
The history of Manipur accounts for many kings with the name "Pakhangba", more or less having reference to God Pakhangba, among which "Tangja Leela Pakhangba" is one.

Other websites

References 

Kings of Ancient Manipur
Meitei people
Pages with unreviewed translations